Eucapsis is a genus of cyanobacteria belonging to the family Merismopediaceae.

The genus was first described by Clements and Shantz in 1909.

The genus has cosmopolitan distribution.

Species:
 Eucapsis alpina Clements & Schantz, 1909
 Eucapsis carpatica J. Komárek & F. Hindák, 1988
 Eucapsis densa M.T.P. Azevedo et al.
 Eucapsis himalayensis M. Watanabe & Komárek, 1994
 Eucapsis minor (Skuja) Elenkin, 1933
 Eucapsis minuta F.E. Fritsch, 1912
 Eucapsis parallelepipedon (Schmidle) J. Komárek & F. Hindák, 1989
 Eucapsis salina González-Guerrero, 1948
 Eucapsis salina P. González, 1947
 Eucapsis starmachii J. Komárek & F. Hindák, 1989
 Eucapsis terrestris Akiyama, 1965

References

Cyanobacteria genera
Synechococcales
Taxa described in 1909